The 2005 US Open was the fourth and final Grand Slam of 2005. It was held between August 29, 2005 and September 11, 2005. The "9/11/01" sign to remember the 9/11 attacks was not featured on the court. It was, however, featured during the 2011 final between Novak Djokovic and Rafael Nadal, the 2016 final between Djokovic and Stan Wawrinka, and the 2021 final between Djokovic and Daniil Medvedev, respectively.

Roger Federer was successful in defending his 2004 title, defeating Andre Agassi in the final. Svetlana Kuznetsova was unsuccessful in her title defence, losing in the first round against compatriot Ekaterina Bychkova. Kim Clijsters won her first Grand Slam title after four previous Grand Slam final losses. It was the first of three US Open titles for Clijsters, also winning in 2009 and 2010. This was the first time that future US Open (Tennis) champion Andy Murray was featured in the tournament.

Seniors

Men's singles

 Roger Federer defeating  Andre Agassi, 6–3, 2–6, 7–6(1), 6–1
It was Federer's 10th title of the year, and his 32nd overall. It was his 6th career Grand Slam title, and his 2nd (consecutive) US Open title.

Women's singles

 Kim Clijsters defeating  Mary Pierce, 6–3, 6–1
It was Clijsters's 7th title of the year, and her 28th overall. It was her 1st career Grand Slam title.

Men's doubles

 Bob Bryan /  Mike Bryan defeating  Jonas Björkman /  Max Mirnyi, 6–1, 6–4

Women's doubles

 Lisa Raymond /  Samantha Stosur defeating  Elena Dementieva /  Flavia Pennetta, 6–2, 5–7, 6–3

Mixed doubles

 Daniela Hantuchová /  Mahesh Bhupathi defeating  Katarina Srebotnik /  Nenad Zimonjić, 6–4, 6–2

Juniors

Boys' singles

 Ryan Sweeting defeating  Jérémy Chardy, 6–4, 6–4

Girls' singles

 Victoria Azarenka defeating  Alexa Glatch, 6–3, 6–4

Boys' doubles

 Alex Clayton /  Donald Young defeating  Carsten Ball /  Thiemo de Bakker, 7–6(3), 4–6, 7–5

Girls' doubles

 Nikola Fraňková /  Alisa Kleybanova defeating  Alexa Glatch /  Vania King, 7–5, 7–6(3)

Seeds

Top 10 seeds (singles)

More information on the top 32 seeds here.

Top 5 seeds (men's doubles)

Top 5 seeds (women's doubles)

Top 5 seeds (mixed doubles)

Withdrawals

Men's Singles
 Guillermo Cañas → replaced by  Dick Norman
 Joachim Johansson → replaced by  Karol Kučera
 Marat Safin → replaced by  Björn Phau

Women's Singles
 Elena Bovina → replaced by  Emmanuelle Gagliardi
 Michaëlla Krajicek → replaced by  Ekaterina Bychkova
 Vera Zvonareva → replaced by  María Sánchez Lorenzo

Highlights
Day 1
 Defending champion Svetlana Kuznetsova of Russia became the first defending women's champion to lose in the first round during the Open Era. She lost to Ekaterina Bychkova 6-3, 6-4. It marked the fourth time a women's defending champion was ousted in her first match.
 Ninth-seeded Gastón Gaudio (2004 French Open champion) also lost in the first round. He was beaten by wildcard Brian Baker in straight sets: 7-6(9), 6-2, 6-4.
Day 2
 2003 Champion Andy Roddick lost to Gilles Müller 7-6, 7-6, 7-6.
Day 3
Day 4
 Indian teen sensation Sania Mirza became the first Indian woman to reach the 4th round of any Grand Slam.
Day 5
Day 6
 American James Blake takes out No. 2 seed - and one of the candidates to win the title - Rafael Nadal of Spain. James Blake declared the player of the day for the 2nd time in the tournament.
Day 7
 Tenth seed Venus Williams beats her little sister and 2005 Australian Open champion Serena Williams to reach the quarter-finals, (7-6, 6-2). It was only the second time (after their second round meeting at the 1998 Australian Open) that the sisters met before the quarter-finals of a Grand Slam tournament.
Day 8
 Andre Agassi is stretched to five sets against Belgian Xavier Malisse.
Day 9
  Roger Federer loses his first set of the tournament against Nicolas Kiefer of Germany. He progresses in four sets.
  Kim Clijsters of Belgium continues to dominate the hardcourt summer. Her victim in the quarter-final was Venus Williams. Clijsters wins 4-6, 7-5 and 6-1.
Day 10
 Both  Andre Agassi and Robby Ginepri needed five difficult sets to beat James Blake and  Guillermo Coria in their quarter-final matches.
 Second seed Lindsay Davenport loses in three sets to Russian Elena Dementieva and for the first time since 1994 there are no American representatives in the women's semifinals.
Day 11
 Daniela Hantuchová and Mahesh Bhupathi are champions in Mixed Doubles against Katarina Srebotnik and Nenad Zimonjić.
Day 12
Twin brothers Mike and Bob Bryan, after being runners-up at the other three Grand Slams, are champions for the first time in the US Open in the Men's Doubles championship, winning the 1st Seed Jonas Björkman and Max Mirnyi.
Day 13
 Kim Clijsters wins her first Grand Slam title after defeating Mary Pierce in 6-3, 6-1.
Day 14
Roger Federer wins the title defeating Andre Agassi in four sets.

Player of the day
Day 1 -  Brian Baker for upset defeat of  Gastón Gaudio
Day 2 -  James Blake for a comeback after injury-marred 2004
Day 3 -  Sania Mirza for winning the match despite bleeding toes
Day 4 -  Andre Agassi for second most wins in the US Open history
Day 5 -  Nicole Vaidišová for a personal best performance in a Grand Slam Tourney
Day 6 -  James Blake for defeating No. 2 seed  Rafael Nadal
Day 7 -  Venus Williams for defeating sister  Serena Williams
Day 8 -  Guillermo Coria on winning the longest match (4 & 1/2 hours) of 2005 US open
Day 9 -  Jarkko Nieminen for becoming the first Finnish man to reach the quarter finals of a grand slam
Day 10 -  Mary Pierce for a great comeback and making it to the US Open Semifinal for the 1st time
Day 11 -  Daniela Hantuchová and  Mahesh Bhupathi for winning the mixed doubles title
Day 12 -  Mike and  Bob Bryan for winning their first men's doubles title
Day 13 -  Kim Clijsters for capturing her first Grand Slam singles title
Day 14 -  Roger Federer for capturing the men's singles title

External links

Official website of US Open
Archived results on SI.com
Tennis Quickfound 2005 US Open Page (Women's Results)

Notes

 
US Open (tennis)
U.S. Open
US Open
2005
US Open
US Open
US Open